Riccardo Ventre (born 20 June 1944 in Formicola) is an Italian politician and Member of the European Parliament for Southern with the Forza Italia, part of the European People's Party and is vice-chair of the European Parliament's Committee on Constitutional Affairs.

He is a substitute for the Committee on Regional Development, a member of the Delegation for relations with the Mashreq countries and a substitute for the Delegation to the Euro-Mediterranean Parliamentary Assembly.

Education
 Graduate in law
 Graduate in political science
 Graduate in philosophy (first class 'cum laude')
 Specialised in administrative law and the science of administration
 Specialised in international law and politics at the Institute for International Political Studies (ISPI) of Milan
 Professor of administrative procedural law at the 'Seconda Università degli Studi' of Naples
 Professor of public and administrative law at the 'Ezio Vanoni' school of higher education, Rome
 Former Provincial Commissioner of the Italian People's Party, Regional Commissioner for Campania and member of the national leadership of the CDU
 Is now national adviser for Forza Italia
 Former member of the Municipal Council and member of the Municipal Executive of the member of the Provincial Council, Mayor, Chairman of 'mountain borough'
 Chairman of Board of Directors of public-private joint enterprises, chairman of banking institution promotion committees, chairman of industrial districts
 Former Member of the Committee on Constitutional Affairs and Governance of the Committee of the Regions
 Chairman of the Provincial Council of Caserta

See also
2004 European Parliament election in Italy

External links
 
 

1944 births
Living people
People from Caserta
Forza Italia MEPs
MEPs for Italy 2004–2009
21st-century Italian politicians
Presidents of the Province of Caserta